Joseph Kosgei (born 25 August 1974) is a Kenyan middle-distance runner who specializes in the 3000 metres. He was a team gold medallist at the 2002 IAAF World Cross Country Championships.

International competitions

Personal bests
3000 metres - 7:39.38 min (2002)
5000 metres - 13:11.32 min (2004)

External links

1974 births
Living people
Kenyan male middle-distance runners
Kenyan male long-distance runners
Kenyan male cross country runners